Jan-Egil Uthberg  is a Norwegian handball player.

He made his debut on the Norwegian national team in 1963, 
and played 50 matches for the national team between 1963 and 1971. He participated at the 1964, 1967, and 1970 World Men's Handball Championship.

References

Year of birth missing (living people)
Living people
Norwegian male handball players